Ballia is a city with a municipal board in the Indian state of Uttar Pradesh. It has a protected area, the Jai Prakash Narayan bird sanctuary.

Etymology
According to locals, the name Ballia was derived from the name of the sage Valmiki, the author of Ramayana. Valmiki resided here at one point, and the place was commemorated by a shrine (although it has long since been washed away). Another belief about the origin of the name is that it refers to the sandy quality of the soil, locally known as "Ballua" (balu meaning sand)..During the Quit India Movement of 1942, Ballia district saw much activity, leading to it gaining the nickname "Bagi ballia"or"Revolutionary Ballia".

Geography
Ballia district is the easternmost part of the Uttar Pradesh state and borders on Bihar State. It comprises an irregularly shaped tract extending westward from the confluence of the Ganga and the Ghaghra, the former separating it from Bihar in the south and the latter from Deoria and Bihar in the north and east respectively. The boundary between Ballia and Bihar is determined by the deep streams of these two rivers. It is bounded on the west by Mau, on the north by Deoria, on the north-east and south-east by Bihar and on the south-west by Ghazipur. The district lies between the parallels of 25º33' and 26º11' North latitudes and 83º38' and 84º39' East longitudes. Ballia is among the least forest covered districts in India.According to Census 2011 data of India, there are 2361 villages in Ballia District of Uttar Pradesh, India. These villages are located in the Bairia, Ballia, Bansdih, Belthara Road, Rasra and Sikanderpur Tehsils. And Ballia has many famous villages/area like Nawanagar, Husenpur, Jajoli, Rasra, maldah etc.Some famous teachers of this place as follow Shri K.P Singh(village hadsar), Shri Dewnath Singh(village husenpur), Shri Bhuwal Singh(village Chandi), Shri Heeralal Gupta(village Nawanagar), Late Shri Abhay Shankar singh(village Husenpur), Shri Parasnath Verma(village kathaura).They all worked very well for education.They all belong to "Janta Inter College,Nawanagar,Ballia". And This school was inaugurated by "Ex Prime Minister Chandra Shekhar ji". Ballia is also known for their "Dadri Mela" which is a fair along with cattle fair. This mela is organised in memory of "Bhirgunath Baba".

Climate

Demographics

In 1901, Ballia had a population of 15,278.  According to the 2001 Indian census, Ballia had a population of 102,226. Males constituted 54% of the population and females 46%. Ballia had an average literacy rate of 65%, which was higher than the national average of 59.5%, with 58% of the males and 42% of females being literate.  11% of the population was under six years of age.

As of 2011 Indian Census, Ballia had a total population of 104,424, of which 55,459 were males and 48,965 were females with a sex ratio of 883 females per 1000 males. The population within the age group of 0 to 6 years was 11,623. The total number of literates in Ballia was 77,331, which constituted 74.1% of the population with male literacy of 78.0% and female literacy of 69.5%. The effective literacy rate of 7+ population of Ballia was 83.3%, of which male literacy rate was 88.0% and female literacy rate was 78.0%. The Scheduled Castes and Scheduled Tribes population was 8,703 and 3,942 respectively. Ballia had 15772 households in 2011.

Religion 

Hinduism is major religion in Ballia city, with 92,299 Hindus (88.39%), followed by 10,851 Muslims (10.39%) and 1.22% following other religions, includes Sikhs (0.23%), Christians (0.13%), Buddhists (0.04%), Jains (0.01%) and not stated (0.81%).

Independence 
Ballia was the first independent city of India, it got independence on 19 August 1942.

Transportation 
Ballia railway station caters to many trains daily including 2 Rajdhani Expresses. Train connectivity to major cities of India like Delhi, Mumbai, Kolkata as well as to Lucknow, Kanpur, Aligarh, Agra, Varanasi and Allahabad via many trains is available.

Ballia is well connected to the state capital Lucknow and the cities of Varanasi, Gorakhpur, Kanpur, Agra, Varanasi and Allahabad by road. The state bus corporation UPSRTC is the primary road transport media.

Dadri Mela (fair) 
The fair starts with people taking a holy dip in the river Ganges on the full moon of Kartik Poornima (October–November). This fair is held annually in the honour of Dardar Muni, the disciple of Maharishi Bhrigu.

This one-month-long fair is organised in two phases. The first phase starts ten days before the onset of Kartik Poornima, during which traders bring some excellent breeds of cattle from across India for sale/purchase. On or after Kartik Poornima, various cultural programs are organised and one can find here a large number of makeshift shops of various items during the next fortnight.

Education

Universities and colleges
The Jananayak Chandrashekhar University, Ballia is a state university established in 2016 by Government of Uttar Pradesh in Ballia, Uttar Pradesh.

It is an affiliating University and university began its first season in 2016–17 with 122 colleges of Ballia. These 122 colleges of Ballia were formerly affiliated to Mahatma Gandhi Kashi Vidyapith, Varanasi. For the academic year 2016–17 exams were conducted by Mahatma Gandhi Kashi Vidyapith, Varanasi but students were awarded a degree of Jananayak Chandrashekhar University, Ballia.

Schools
Kendriya Vidyalaya, Ballia
Jawahar Navodaya Vidyalaya, Ballia
Holy Cross School, Ballia

Notable people
List of people from Ballia
Chandra Shekhar
Mangal Pandey 
Jay Prakash Narayan

References

External links

 Official Website of the Ballia district
 Ballia city portal
 Ballia city portal
 Ballia city portal
 Ballia city portal

 
Cities and towns in Ballia district
Cities in Uttar Pradesh